Trevithick is a Cornish surname, and may refer to:

 Francis Trevithick (1812–1877), one of the first locomotive engineers of the London and North Western Railway
 Jonathan Trevethick (1864–1939), New Zealand politician
 Paul Trevithick (born 1959), American inventor, engineer and entrepreneur
 Richard Trevithick (1771–1833), British inventor, mining engineer and builder of the first working railway steam locomotive.
 William Edward Trevithick (1899–1958), Irish botanical illustrator 

Cornish-language surnames